Herman August Meyer House is a historic home located at Davis, Tucker County, West Virginia. It was built about 1891, and is a -story, "T"-shaped, 5-bay central-passage I house of wood construction.  It was built as a single-family residence, and converted for use as a bed and breakfast inn.  Also on the property is a domestic dependency, built about 1891.

It was listed on the National Register of Historic Places in 2010.

References

External links
Meyer House Bed and Breakfast website

Houses on the National Register of Historic Places in West Virginia
Houses completed in 1891
Houses in Tucker County, West Virginia
I-house architecture in West Virginia
National Register of Historic Places in Tucker County, West Virginia